Kangrali (KH) is a census town in Belgaum district in the Indian state of Karnataka.

Demographics
As of October 2011 India census, Kangrali (KH) had a population of 9,671. Males constitute 51% of the population and females 49%. Kangrali (KH) has an average literacy rate of 73%, higher than the national average of 59.5%: male literacy is 79%, and female literacy is 67%. In Kangrali (KH), 14% of the population is under 6 years of age.

References

Cities and towns in Belagavi district